San Juan, Puerto Rico, held an election for mayor on November 6, 2012. Among other elections, it was held concurrently with the 2012 Puerto Rico gubernatorial election. It saw the election of Popular Democracy Party nominee Carmen Yulín Cruz ho unseated incumbent New Progressive Party mayor Jorge Santini.

Nominees
Carmen Yulín Cruz (Popular Democracy Party), member of the Puerto Rico House of Representatives since 2009
Jorge Santini Padilla (New Progressive Party), incumbent mayor since 2001
Luis Roberto Piñero (Puerto Rican Independence Party)
Tito Román Rivera (Working People's Party)

Results

See also
2012 Puerto Rican general election

References

2012
San Juan, Puerto Rico mayoral
San Juan, Puerto Rico